James Delaney may refer to:

 James J. Delaney (1901–1987), Representative from New York
 James Delaney (tennis) (born 1953), former professional tennis player
 James Delaney (mayor) (1896–1970), mayor of Anchorage, Alaska, 1929–1932
 James Delaney (Taboo), a character in the British television drama series, Taboo
 Jimmy Delaney (1914–1989), Scottish footballer
 James Delaney (boxer), also known as Jimmy Doyle, boxer who died after a bout with Sugar Ray Robinson
 James Delaney (rugby league), rugby league player
 Jim Delaney (1921–2012), American athlete

See also
 Jim Delany (born 1948), commissioner of the Big Ten Conference